Secret Orders is a lost 1926 American silent drama film directed by Chester Withey and starring Harold Goodwin, Robert Frazer and Evelyn Brent. The film was set in World War I and contained what the Chester Times described as a "world of swift-flowing melodrama.

Cast
 Harold Goodwin as Eddie Delano  
 Robert Frazer as Bruce Corbin  
 Evelyn Brent as Janet Graaham  
 John Gough as Spike Slavin  
 Margerie Bonner as Mary, Janet's friend 
 Brandon Hurst as Butler  
 Frank Leigh as Cook

References

Bibliography
 Lynn Kear & James King. Evelyn Brent: The Life and Films of Hollywood's Lady Crook. McFarland, 2009.

External links
 

1926 films
1926 drama films
1920s English-language films
American silent feature films
Silent American drama films
Films directed by Chester Withey
American black-and-white films
Lost American films
Film Booking Offices of America films
1920s American films